Chaerilidae is a family of scorpions. It contains two genera, the extant Chaerilus (Simon, 1877) and the extinct Electrochaerilus (Santiago-Blay, Fet, Soleglad & Anderson, 2004).

References

External links 
 

Scorpion families